Nikola Čelebić (Cyrillic: Никола Челебић, born 4 July 1989) is a Montenegrin football defender playing with FK Podgorica in the Montenegrin First League.

Club career
Born in Titograd, SFR Yugoslavia (nowadays Podgorica, Montenegro), he played in the youth teams of FK Partizan. His first season as senior was with FK Sopot in the 2007-08 Serbian League Belgrade, third level league in Serbia.

In summer 2008 he moved back to Montenegro to play with FK Jedinstvo Bijelo Polje in the Montenegrin First League. After that season, he will play in 2009–10 with FK Bratstvo Cijevna before returning a year later to the Montenegrin top league, this time to play with OFK Petrovac.

In summer 2011 he was back in Serbia, this time to play with top-level club, FK BSK Borča. He plays as a left-back.

International career
He was part of the Montenegrin U19 national team.

References

External sources
 
 

1989 births
Living people
Footballers from Podgorica
Association football defenders
Montenegrin footballers
Montenegro youth international footballers
FK Jedinstvo Bijelo Polje players
FK Bratstvo Cijevna players
OFK Petrovac players
FK BSK Borča players
FK Budućnost Podgorica players
FK Bokelj players
FK Radnik Bijeljina players
OFK Grbalj players
FK Podgorica players
Montenegrin First League players
Serbian SuperLiga players
Premier League of Bosnia and Herzegovina players
Montenegrin Second League players
Montenegrin expatriate footballers
Expatriate footballers in Serbia
Montenegrin expatriate sportspeople in Serbia
Expatriate footballers in Bosnia and Herzegovina
Montenegrin expatriate sportspeople in Bosnia and Herzegovina